Pookkalam Varavayi is a 1991 Indian Malayalam-language comedy-drama film directed by Kamal and written by Ranjith from a story by P. R. Nathan. It stars Jayaram, Sunitha, Shamili, Murali, and Geetha. Divya Unni and Kavya Madhavan made their debuts in the film as child artists. The plot revolves around the friendship between a school bus driver, Nandan, and a little girl, Geethu.

Plot

Five-year-old Geethu's parents get divorced, so she now stays four days a week with her mom and three days with her dad as per the court's order. She becomes friendly with Nandan, the driver of her school bus.

During her Christmas vacation, Geethu decides to go to Nandan's village without informing her parents. Nandan's sister had recently lost her daughter, who was the same age as Geethu, when she drowned in the village river. Geethu wins the heart of everyone in the village and becomes the center of attention there. Meanwhile, her parents are worried about their missing child and are searching for her everywhere.

Finally, they learn where Geethu is and come to the village to retrieve her. Geethu also falls into the river — the same way Nandan's niece drowned — but is rescued by Nandan. The tension and anxiety unite her parents and they decide to live together again.

Cast
Jayaram as Nandan 
Sunitha as Thulasi, Nandan's love interest 
Baby Shamili as Geethu 
Murali as Jayaraj, Geethu's father 
Geetha as Usha, Geethu's mother 
Innocent as Pothuval 
Jagathy Sreekumar as Cherukunnathu Bhaskara Pillai 
Rekha as Nirmala, Nandan's sister 
Thikkurissy Sukumaran Nair as Muthachan 
Kaviyoor Ponnamma as Nandan's Mother 
Philomina as Akkamma 
Sankaradi as The Priest 
Kalpana as the Tuition Teacher 
Meenakumari as Bhaskara Pillai and Jayaraj's Sister 
Kuthiravattam Pappu as Mariyappan 
Paravoor Bharathan as Bus Driver 
Kavya Madhavan as First School Girl 
Divya Unni as Second School Girl
 Baby Charishma as Third School Girl

Soundtrack

References

External links
 

1990s Malayalam-language films
1991 films
1991 drama films
Films directed by Kamal (director)
Films with screenplays by Ranjith
Films scored by Ouseppachan